The 1976 Ottawa Rough Riders finished in 1st place in the Eastern Conference with a 9–6–1 record and won the Grey Cup. This would be the last time in their franchise history that they would win the Grey Cup. The Ottawa Redblacks would subsequently win the 104th Grey Cup game at the conclusion of the 2016 CFL season, ending a 40-year Grey Cup drought for the City of Ottawa, which begun subsequent to their Grey Cup victory in 1976 (this ended what was arguably the longest Grey Cup drought in the CFL, though the City of Ottawa was without a CFL team between 1997 and 2001 and again between 2006 and 2013).

Offseason

1976 CFL Draft
In the first round of the 1976 CFL Draft, Ottawa selected Bill Hatanaka. Bob O'Billovich was hired as an assistant coach.

Preseason

Regular season

Standings

Schedule

Postseason

Playoffs

Grey Cup
In the final minute, Saskatchewan punted into a strong wind. Ottawa would have the ball on the Saskatchewan 35-yard line. With 44 seconds left, Ottawa quarterback Tom Clements passed to tight end Tony Gabriel, and Ottawa was at Saskatchewan's 20 yard line. The next pass would win the game, as Gabriel caught the ball in the end zone for the game-winning touchdown.

Player stats

Passing

Receiving

Rushing

Awards and honours
 CFL's Most Outstanding Canadian Award – Tony Gabriel (TE)
 Grey Cup Most Valuable Player, Tom Clements, (QB)
 Tom Clements, All-Eastern Quarterback
 Art Green, Running Back, CFL All-Star
 Tony Gabriel, Tight End, CFL All-Star
 Mark Kosmos, Linebacker, CFL All-Star
Jim Reid, Fullback, Rookie of the Year Award

References

Ottawa Rough Riders seasons
James S. Dixon Trophy championship seasons
Grey Cup championship seasons
1976 Canadian Football League season by team